Charles Gullans (May 5, 1929 – March 30, 1993) was an American poet, bibliographer, and educator. His first book, Arrivals and Departures (University of Minnesota Press, 1962), was his most critically acclaimed publication. He published five more poetry collections during his life. He also published translations including Last Letters from Stalingrad and The Wrong Side of the Rug, and compiled bibliographies of the works of Sir Robert Ayton and J V Cunningham.

Life
Charles Bennett Gullans was born in Minneapolis, Minnesota. He earned a bachelor's degree in 1948 and master's degree in 1951 from the University of Minnesota. He completed a doctorate at Stanford University in 1956. He taught briefly at the University of Washington, after which he returned to California. He spent nearly his entire career as a professor of English at the University of California at Los Angeles.

Gullans died at UCLA Medical Center of respiratory failure after undergoing surgery for cancer.

Poetry collections

Translations

Bibliographies

References

External sources 

 Stuart A. Rose Manuscript, Archives, and Rare Book Library

1929 births
1993 deaths
University of Minnesota alumni
20th-century American poets
Poets from Minnesota
Writers from Minneapolis
University of Washington faculty
Stanford University alumni
University of California, Los Angeles faculty
American male poets
20th-century American male writers